FC Torpedo Rubtsovsk is a Russian football team from Rubtsovsk. As of 2014, it plays in the Amateur Football League. It played professionally in 1964–1970, 1977–1998 and in 2002. Their best result was 2nd place in Zone 4 of the Soviet Second League in 1980 and in Zone 7 of the Russian Second Division in 1993.

Team name history
 1964–1999: FC Torpedo Rubtsovsk
 2000–2005: FC Torpedo-Alttrak Rubtsovsk
 2006–present: FC Torpedo Rubtsovsk

External links
  Unofficial website
  Team history at KLISF

Association football clubs established in 1964
Football clubs in Russia
Sport in Altai Krai
1964 establishments in Russia